387th may refer to:

387th Air Expeditionary Group (387 AEG) is a provisional United States Air Force unit assigned to the 386th Air Expeditionary Wing at Ali Al Salem Air Base, Kuwait
387th EOD (Explosive Ordnance Disposal) Company, part of the 79th Troop Command, Massachusetts Army National Guard, United States Army National Guard
387th Fighter Squadron or 175th Fighter Squadron, unit of the South Dakota Air National Guard stationed at Joe Foss Field Air National Guard Station, South Dakota
387th Tactical Fighter Squadron, inactive United States Air Force unit

See also
387 (number)
387, the year 387 (CCCLXXXVII) of the Julian calendar
387 BC